Gymnospermium is a group of tuberous flowering plants in the barberry family described as a genus in 1839. It is native to temperate Europe and Asia.

Species

References

Berberidaceae
Berberidaceae genera